Nipinnawasee (formerly Nipinnawassee, Nippinnawasee, and Nippinnawassee) is a census-designated place in Madera County, California, United States. The population was 434 at the 2020 census.

History
The town was named about 1908 by Edgar B. Landon who brought the name from Michigan, where, according to the Native Americans of his native district, it means "plenty of deer". The name was accepted by the Post Office in 1915.

A post office operated at Nipinnawasee from 1912 to 1961. Unfortunately, it was destroyed in 1961 when a fire consumed the entire town in just 15 minutes. Nipinnawasee proper was never rebuilt, although people continue to live in the area for the views of the Sierras. Most residents travel into Oakhurst,  to the southeast, for their business needs.

Geography
The community is along the northwest edge of Madera County, bordered by Ahwahnee to the southeast and Mariposa County to the northwest. California State Route 49 is the main road through the community.

The community drains to Peterson Creek, a south-flowing tributary of the Fresno River.

Demographics
The 2010 United States Census reported that Nipinnawasee had a population of 475. The racial makeup of Nipinnawasee was 422 (88.8%) White, 2 (0.4%) African American, 9 (1.9%) Native American, 0 (0.0%) Asian, 0 (0.0%) Pacific Islander, 3 (0.6%) from other races, and 39 (8.2%) from two or more races. Hispanic or Latino of any race were 50 persons (10.5%).

The Census reported that 475 people (100% of the population) lived in households, 0 (0%) lived in non-institutionalized group quarters, and 0 (0%) were institutionalized.

There were 192 households, out of which 47 (24.5%) had children under the age of 18 living in them, 126 (65.6%) were opposite-sex married couples living together, 15 (7.8%) had a female householder with no husband present, 9 (4.7%) had a male householder with no wife present.  There were 9 (4.7%) unmarried opposite-sex partnerships, and 0 (0%) same-sex married couples or partnerships. 33 households (17.2%) were made up of individuals, and 11 (5.7%) had someone living alone who was 65 years of age or older. The average household size was 2.47.  There were 150 families (78.1% of all households); the average family size was 2.68.

The population was spread out, with 90 people (18.9%) under the age of 18, 35 people (7.4%) aged 18 to 24, 74 people (15.6%) aged 25 to 44, 177 people (37.3%) aged 45 to 64, and 99 people (20.8%) who were 65 years of age or older.  The median age was 49.5 years. For every 100 females, there were 93.1 males.  For every 100 females age 18 and over, there were 90.6 males.

The homeowner vacancy rate was 1.4%; the rental vacancy rate was 11.1%.  337 people (70.9% of the population) lived in owner-occupied housing units and 138 people (29.1%) lived in rental housing units.

References

Census-designated places in Madera County, California
Census-designated places in California